River Heights is a suburb and community area in Winnipeg, Manitoba. It is bordered by Route 90 to the west, the Assiniboine River to the north, Cambridge Street to the east, and Taylor Avenue to the south.

History

The land of present-day River Heights was once part of the Parish of St. Boniface. It was annexed by the City of Winnipeg in 1882, though substantial development did not occur in the area until after World War I.

Some streets at the eastern end of River Heights are named after types of deciduous trees, Oak, Elm, Ash, while others are named after places, Waterloo (1881), Montrose, Oxford.

River Heights, along with West Fort Rouge, comprised the South End of the old City of Winnipeg. It was these areas that contributed the majority of the men and the money to form the Citizens Committee of 1000, the group that broke the Winnipeg General Strike of 1919.

Demographics

In 2016, the population of River Heights was 57,375, (18,995 not including "East River Heights from Census definition) has been constantly going down since 1971 when the population was 70,650, other than the 0.5% increase from 2001 to 2006. The median household income in River Heights is $47,646, slightly lower than the city-average at $49,790.

Though the neighbourhood was traditionally an Anglo-Saxon Protestant area, today the area has a more diverse population, featuring a significant Jewish presence, which makes up 11% of the neighbourhood's population.

Racial demographics

Points of interest
River Heights is part of the Winnipeg School Division, and includes the following schools:

 Brock-Corydon Elementary School
 J. B. Mitchell School
 Montrose Elementary School
 Queenston Elementary School
 River Heights School
 Robert H. Smith Elementary School
 Ecole Sir William Osler
Private schools in the area include St. John Brebeuf School.

For sports/athletics, the area has the River Heights Community Club and the Sir John Franklin Community Club. Other points of interest include River Heights Public Library, Grant Park Shopping Centre (including McNally Robinson Booksellers), Pan Am Pool, and Manitoba Electrical Museum.

Major streets of River Heights include Academy Road and Stafford Street.

Neighbourhoods
River Heights is divided into two neighbourhood clusters: River Heights West and River Heights East, which encompass 17 neighbourhoods in Winnipeg in total.

River Heights East

 Lord Roberts
 McMillan
 River-Osborne
 Riverview
 Roslyn

Crime rates
River Heights is known to be one of the safer urban areas of Winnipeg. The table below shows the crime rates of various crimes in each of the River Heights neighbourhoods. The crime data spans 5 years from the year 2017 to the year 2021. The rates are crimes per 100,000 residents per year.

References

Jews and Judaism in Winnipeg
Neighbourhoods in Winnipeg